Chittaranjan Das (5 November 1870 – 16 June 1925), popularly called Deshbandhu (Friend of the Nation), was an Indian freedom fighter, political activist and lawyer during the Indian Independence Movement and founder-leader of the Swaraj Party in undivided Bengal during the period of British Colonial rule in India. His name is abbreviated as C. R. Das.
He was closely associated with a number of literary societies and wrote poems, apart from numerous articles and essays.

Early life

Chittaranjan Das was born in Bikrampur in a well known Baidya"Das"family in the village named "Telirbagh" which is situated in present-day Tongibari upozila of Munshiganj (Bikrampur) district of Bangladesh on 5 November 1870

Family 

Das family were members of Brahmo Samaj. Chittaranjan was the son of Bhuban Mohan Das, and nephew of the Brahmo social reformer Durga Mohan Das. His father was a solicitor and a journalist who edited the English church weekly, The Brahmo Public Opinion. Some of his cousins were Atul Prasad Sen, Satya Ranjan Das, Satish Ranjan Das, Sudhi Ranjan Das, Sarala Roy and Lady Abala Bose. His eldest grandson was Siddhartha Shankar Ray and his grand daughter is Justice Manjula Bose.

He married Basanti Devi (1880–1974) and had three children, Aparna Devi (1898–1972), Chiraranjan Das (1899–1928) and Kalyani Devi (1902–1983).

Education

The Das family of Durga Mohan was a family of lawyers. Durga Mohan's eldest son Satya Ranjan matriculated at Emmanuel College, Cambridge and was at Middle Temple during 1883–1886, followed by Chitta Ranjan Das, Durga Mohan's brother's son, during 1890–1894. Satish Ranjan Das (1891–1894), Jyotish Ranjan Das and Atul Prasad Sen (1892–1895) followed suit.

In London Das befriended with Sri Aurobindo Ghosh, Atul Prasad Sen and Sarojini Naidu among others, and together they promoted Dadabhai Naoroji in the British Parliament.

Career

Law career

In 1894 Das gave up his law practice, and went into politics during the non-cooperation movement against the British colonial government. He again took up the brief, and successfully defended Aurobindo Ghosh on charges of involvement in the Alipore bomb case, in 1909. In his Uttarpara speech, Sri Aurobindo acknowledged that Das broke his health to save him.

In the Alipore bomb case in 1908, Chittaranjan Das as defence counsel for Sri Aurobindo Ghosh, made this closing statement:

Political career

Chittaranjan Das was actively involved in the activities of Anushilan Samiti. When Pramatha Mitter organised the Samiti as its president to produce hundreds of young firebrands who were ready to sacrifice their lives for the cause of the Nation, Chittaranjan became his associate. Anushilan Samiti was maintained by P. Mitter with the assistance of Chittaranjan Das (1894), Haridas Bose (1895), Suren Haldar (1900) and Manabendra Nath Roy (1901).

He was a leading figure in Bengal during the Non-Cooperation Movement of 1919–1922, and initiated the ban on British-made clothes, setting an example by burning his own European clothes and wearing Khadi clothes. At one time, his clothes were tailored and washed in Paris and he maintained a permanent laundry in Paris to ship his clothes to Calcutta. He sacrificed all this luxury when he became attached to the Freedom Movement.
He brought out a newspaper called Forward and later changed its name to Liberty as part of his support for various anti-British movements in India. When the Calcutta Municipal Corporation was formed, he became its first mayor.

He was a believer in non-violence and constitutional methods for the realisation of national independence, and advocated Hindu-Muslim unity, cooperation and communal harmony and championed the cause of national education. He resigned his presidency of the Indian National Congress at the Gaya session after losing a motion on "No Council Entry" to Gandhi's faction. He then founded the Congress-Khilafat Swaraj Party, with Narasimha Chintaman Kelkar and veteran Motilal Nehru. Other prominent leaders included Huseyn Shaheed Suhrawardy and Subhas Chandra Bose of Bengal, Vithalbhai Patel and other Congress leaders who were becoming dissatisfied with the Congress. In May 1923, at AICC meet in Bombay, Das was able to get majority support for his policy of council entry, with 96 members voting in favour, and 71 against.

Poet
Chittaranjan Das emerged as a distinguished Bengali poet, when, during the troubled days of National movement, he published the first two volumes of his collection of poems titled "Malancha" and "Mala". In 1913 he published "Sagar Sangeet" (The Songs of the Sea). Sri Aurobindo was in Pondichery and when he was in dire need of financial support. Chittaranjan offered him one thousand rupees as a token of his support for an English translation of the poem, a few verses of which are given below:

Chittaranjan started a monthly journal named Narayana, and many eminent writers such as Sharat Chandra Chattopadhyay, Bipin Chandra Pal and Hariprasad Shastri contributed their writings in the journal.

Death

In 1925 Chittaranjan's health began to fail due to overwork. Chittaranjan went to Darjeeling to recuperate his health staying at Sir N. N. Sircar's house "Step Aside" in May 1925. Mahatma Gandhi visited him and stayed with him for some days. Gandhiji wrote, 

The funeral procession in Calcutta was led by Gandhi, who said:

Legacy

 Chittaranjan National Cancer Institute of Kolkata had its humble beginning in the year 1950 when the Chittaranjan Cancer Hospital was founded in the premises of Chittaranjan Seva Sadan. A few years before his death Chittaranjan gifted this property including his house and the adjoining lands to the nation to be used for the betterment of the lives of women.
 Chittaranjan Avenue, the main thoroughfare of Kolkata connecting North Kolkata with Central Kolkata, it was formerly known as Central Avenue.
 Chittaranjan, a town located in the Paschim Bardhaman district near Asansol. It is located at the border of Bengal and Jharkhand. It is famous for housing the legendary Chittaranjan Locomotive Works.
 Chittaranjan Locomotive Works , the largest locomotive manufacturing unit in the whole world.
 Chittaranjan College , a bachelor arts and science government college located in the historic College Street district of North Kolkata.
Chittaranjan Park,home to large Bengali community, originally EPDP Colony in South Delhi was named after Deshbandhu Chittaranjan Das during 1980's https://en.m.wikipedia.org/wiki/Chittaranjan_Park

References

External links

 
 
 
 
 

1869 births
1925 deaths
Brahmos
Bengali Hindus
Das family of Telirbagh
Indian barristers
Indian independence activists from Bengal
Politicians from Kolkata
Presidents of the Indian National Congress
People from Bikrampur
Mayors of Kolkata
19th-century Indian lawyers
20th-century Indian lawyers
Indian independence activists from West Bengal